Robert Gould Jay (born November 18, 1965) is an American former professional ice hockey player and coach. He appeared in three games for the Los Angeles Kings in the National Hockey League (NHL) during the 1993–94 season, and played nine seasons in the International Hockey League (IHL) between 1990 and 1999.

After his playing career ended, Jay turned to coaching, most notably as an assistant to Ted Donato at Harvard University from 2004 to 2007 and again from 2009 to 2011. He has been an assistant coach for the United States women's national ice hockey team through several campaigns including the Sochi Olympics where the team won a silver medal.  Jay was also head coach for the Boston Pride of the National Women's Hockey League from 2015 to 2017.

Career statistics

Regular season and playoffs

References

External links
 

1965 births
Living people
American men's ice hockey defensemen
Detroit Vipers players
Fort Wayne Komets players
Ice hockey coaches from Massachusetts
Ice hockey players from Massachusetts
Los Angeles Kings players
Manchester Monarchs (AHL) players
Merrimack Warriors men's ice hockey players
People from Burlington, Massachusetts
Phoenix Roadrunners (IHL) players
Sportspeople from Middlesex County, Massachusetts
Undrafted National Hockey League players